During the 2009–10 season, Partick Thistle participated in the Scottish First Division, having finished in 2nd place the previous season.

Team kit
The team kit for the 2009–10 season will be produced by Puma in partnership with Greaves Sports and the main shirt sponsor will be Ignis Asset Management as per season 2008–09. The home kit will be the same as season 2008–09 and the away is a silver, black & pink camouflage design with black sleeves. A Centenary top was also announced to mark Thistle's 100th year at Firhill Stadium, to be worn against Dunfermline Athletic in the league match closest to the first ever game at the ground.

Notable events
Season 2009–10 marks the Centenary of Partick Thistle at Firhill Stadium. A Centenary Top (in the club's original navy blue) is to be released by their official partners Greaves Sports and the club also set up a Centenary Fundraiser with the slogan "£100k for 100 Years".

With 2009 also being Alan Archibald's Testimonial Year, several functions were held and a Testimonial Match against a Liverpool XI played. This game took place on Tuesday 11 August, the match ending in a 1–1 draw.

Having been with the Club in a playing capacity until the end of season 2008–09, Simon Donnelly returned in a player-coach role following the departure of John Henry, First Team Coach, to Burnley F.C.

Squad

Youth Squad

Match results

Friendlies

† Alan Archibald's Testimonial

Scottish First Division

Scottish Cup

League Cup

Challenge Cup

Player statistics

League Appearances

Cup Appearances

Scorers

League table

References

Partick Thistle F.C. seasons
Partick Thistle